The United States Senate Committee on Appropriations is a standing committee of the United States Senate. It has jurisdiction over all discretionary spending legislation in the Senate.

The Senate Appropriations Committee is the largest committee in the U.S. Senate, with 30 members in the 117th Congress. Its role is defined by the U.S. Constitution, which requires "appropriations made by law" prior to the expenditure of any money from the Treasury, and the committee is therefore one of the most powerful committees in the Senate. The committee was first organized on March 6, 1867, when power over appropriations was taken out of the hands of the Finance Committee.

The chairman of the Appropriations Committee has enormous power to bring home special projects (sometimes referred to as "pork barrel spending") for their state as well as having the final say on other senators' appropriation requests. For example, in fiscal year 2005 per capita federal spending in Alaska, the home state of then-Chairman Ted Stevens, was $12,000, double the national average. Alaska has 11,772 special earmarked projects for a combined cost of $15,780,623,000. This represents about four percent of the overall spending in the $388 billion Consolidated Appropriations Act of 2005 passed by Congress.

From 2001 to 2021, every Senate Majority Leader has been a previous or concurrently-serving member of the Appropriations Committee: Tom Daschle (committee member, 1991–1999; majority leader, 2001–2003), Bill Frist (committee member, 1995–2002;  majority leader, 2003–2007), Harry Reid (committee member, 1989–2006; majority leader, 2007–2015), Mitch McConnell (current committee member; majority leader, 2015–2021).

The appropriations process

The federal budget is divided into two main categories: discretionary spending and mandatory spending. Each appropriations subcommittee develops a draft appropriations bill covering each agency under its jurisdiction based on the Congressional Budget Resolution, which is drafted by an analogous Senate Budget committee. Each subcommittee must adhere to the spending limits set by the budget resolution and allocations set by the full Appropriations Committee, though the full Senate may vote to waive those limits if 60 senators vote to do so. The committee also reviews supplemental spending bills (covering unforeseen or emergency expenses not previously budgeted).

Each appropriations bill must be passed by both houses of Congress and signed by the president prior to the start of the federal fiscal year, October 1. If that target is not met, as has been common in recent years, the committee drafts a continuing resolution, which is then approved by Congress and signed by the president to keep the federal government operating until the individual bills are approved.

Jurisdiction
In accordance of Rule XXV of the United States Senate, all proposed legislation, messages, petitions, memorials, and other matters relating to the following subjects is referred to the Senate Committee on Appropriations:
 Appropriation of the revenue for the support of the Government, except as provided in subparagraph (e);
 Rescission of appropriations contained in appropriation Acts (referred to in section 105 of title 1, United States Code);
 The amount of new spending authority described in section 401(c)(2) (A) and (B) of the Congressional Budget Act of 1974 which is to be effective for a fiscal year; and,
 New spending authority described in section 401(c)(2)(C) of the Congressional Budget Act of 1974 provided in bills and resolutions referred to the committee under section 401(b)(2) of that Act (but subject to the provisions of section 401(b)(3) of that Act).

Likewise, Article I, Section 9, Clause 7 of the United States Constitution, clearly vesting the power of the purse in Congress, states: “No Money shall be drawn from the Treasury, but in Consequence of Appropriations made by Law...and a regular Statement and Account of the Receipts and expenditures of all public Money shall be published from time to time.” This clause is the foundation for the congressional appropriations process and the fundamental source of the Senate Appropriations Committee's institutional power - as is the same with its counterpart in the lower house. In other words, Article I, Section 9, Clause 7 of the United States Constitution charges the United States Congress with the legislative duty of controlling government spending separate from the executive branch of government - a significant check and balance in the American constitutional system.

Members, 118th Congress

Subcommittees

Committee reorganization during the 110th Congress
At the outset of the 110th Congress, Chairman Robert Byrd and Chairman Dave Obey, his counterpart on the House Appropriations Committee, developed a committee reorganization plan that provided for common subcommittee structures between both houses, a move that both the chairmen hope will allow Congress to "complete action on each of the government funding on time for the first time since 1994." The subcommittees were last overhauled between the 107th and 108th Congresses, after the creation of the Subcommittee on Homeland Security and again during the 109th Congress, when the number of subcommittees was reduced from 13 to 12.

A key part of the new subcommittee organization was the establishment of a new Subcommittee on Financial Services and General Government, which consolidates funding for the Treasury Department, the United States federal judiciary, and the District of Columbia. These functions were previously handled by two separate Senate subcommittees.

Chairs and Vice Chairs, 1867–present

Historical membership rosters

117th Congress

116th Congress

115th Congress 

Source :

114th Congress 

Source:

113th Congress 

Source:

112th Congress

111th Congress

110th Congress

109th Congress

See also
 List of current United States Senate committees
 United States budget process
 U.S. House Committee on Appropriations
 U.S. Senate Appropriations Subcommittee on Labor, Health and Human Services, Education, and Related Agencies
 U.S. Senate Budget Committee
 Appropriations bill (United States)
 2015 United States federal appropriations

References

Further reading
 Frumin, Alan S. "Appropriations" in Riddick's Senate Procedure, 150–213. Washington, D.C.: Government Printing Office, 1992.
 Munson, Richard. The Cardinals of Capitol Hill; The Men and Women Who Control Government Spending. Grove Press, 1993. .
 Senate Committee on Appropriations. United States Senate Committee on Appropriations, United States Senate, 1867–2008. Washington, D.C.: Government Printing Office, 2008.
 Streeter, Sandy. The Congressional Appropriations Process: An Introduction. Washington, D.C.: Congressional Research Service, 2008.

External links
 U.S. Senate Committee on Appropriations Official Website, appropriations.senate.gov (Archive)
 Senate Appropriations Committee. Legislation activity and reports, Congress.gov.
 Status of Appropriations Legislation, Congress.gov.
 Appropriations Subcommittee Structure: History of Changes from 1920 to 2011 by Congressional Research Service.

Appropriations
1867 establishments in Washington, D.C.
Senate Committee on Appropriations
 :